Where There is Love is a 2019 Burmese romantic-drama television series. It aired on MRTV-4, from March 11 to April 8, 2019, on Mondays to Fridays at 19:00 for 20 episodes.

Cast

Main
 Kaung Myat San as Myat Moe Swe
 Hsaung Wutyee May as Thet Thet Zaw
 Aung Paing as Lin Thuta
 May Akari Htoo as Juliya

Supporting
 Phyo Yazar Naing as Zaw Htet
 Nay Yee Win Lai as Ya Min Khin
 Ye Aung as U Moe Zan
 Khin Zarchi Kyaw as Daw Khin Swe Htike
 Cho Pyone as A Phwar Nyein

References

Burmese television series
MRTV (TV network) original programming